David Sassoon (born 1932) is a high end British fashion designer, who owns the Bellville Sassoon salon in Knightsbridge, London, founded by Belinda Bellville in 1953.

Born to Iraqi Jewish parents, Gourgi and Victoria Sassoon in north London, Sassoon initially intended becoming an actor but turned to fashion when his father disapproved. He attended Avigdor High School and Lauderdale Road Synagogue in West London. He was invited by Belinda Bellville to join her salon in 1958 and in 1970 it became the Bellville Sassoon. He counts numerous socialites and the royal family as amongst his clientele and was the most prolific of Princess Diana's early designers. Sassoon has said of Diana, "When she got engaged, her mother brought her in to us and asked us to make the going-away outfit." Aside from Diana, Sassoon has designed clothes for Princess Margaret, Princess Michael of Kent, the Duchess of York, the Duchess of Gloucester, Jackie Kennedy, Audrey Hepburn, Elizabeth Taylor and Jerry Hall.  His designs have appeared on the covers of Vogue and Harper's Bazaar. Sassoon has claimed that he is "probably the only designer around today who has dressed every female member of the royal family except the Queen."

References

British fashion designers
Living people
British people of Iraqi-Jewish descent
English Jews
Jewish fashion designers
1932 births